Julia Stavickaja (born 3 December 1997) is a German rhythmic gymnast. She competed in the group rhythmic gymnastics competition at the 2016 Summer Olympics, where the team was eliminated in the qualification round.

References

Living people
1997 births
German rhythmic gymnasts
Gymnasts at the 2016 Summer Olympics
Olympic gymnasts of Germany